House of Bethmann may refer to:

 Bethmann family, a family in Frankfurt am Main that produced numerous prominent bankers
 Bethmann bank, a bank founded by two members of the Bethmann family in 1748